Timothy Joseph O'Connor (July 3, 1927 – April 5, 2018) was an American character actor known for his prolific work in television, although he made only a few appearances after the early 1990s. Before moving to California, he lived on an island in the middle of Glen Wild Lake, located in Bloomingdale, New Jersey, 30 miles from Manhattan. O'Connor specialized in playing officials, military men, and police officers.

Career
Some of O'Connor's best-known roles include: Dr. Elias Huer in Buck Rogers in the 25th Century, Jack Boland in General Hospital, and Elliot Carson in Peyton Place. He also had recurring roles on Barnaby Jones and Dynasty and made several appearances on Cannon.

O'Connor's film credits include roles in The Groundstar Conspiracy (1972), Across 110th Street (1972), and Sssssss (1973).

He was a director for The Foothill Theater Company in Nevada City, California, before it closed. O'Connor starred in the 2011 film Dreams Awake (with Buck Rogers in the 25th Century co-star Erin Gray).

Death
O'Connor died of colon cancer at his home in Nevada City, California, aged 90.

Selected filmography

Master Minds (1949) – Hoskins Boy (uncredited)
Gunsmoke (1964-1972, TV Series) – Gideon / Arnie Sprague / Kip Gilman
The Twilight Zone (1963, TV Series, Episode: "On Thursday We Leave for Home") – Colonel Sloane  
The Outer Limits (1964, TV Series, Episode: "Moonstone" and "Soldier") - Major Clint Anderson / Paul Tanner
Peyton Place (1965-1968, TV series) - Elliot Carson (series regular)
Incident In San Francisco (1971) – Arthur Andrews
The Failing of Raymond (1971) – Cliff Roeder
Wild in the Sky (1972) – Sen. Bob Recker
The Groundstar Conspiracy (1972) – Frank Gossage
The Streets of San Francisco (1972-1977, TV Series) - Lt. Roy Devitt, SFPD / Frank Maguire
Across 110th Street (1972) – Lt. Hartnett
Columbo (1972, TV Series, Episode: "Double Shock") – Michael Hathaway
Sssssss (1973) – Kogen
The Stranger (1973, TV movie) – Dr. Revere
All in the Family (1975, TV Series, Episode: "Edith's Friend") – Roy Johnson
The Rockford Files (1974, TV series, Episode: "The Dexter Crisis") - Charles Dexter
M*A*S*H (1975-1981, TV Series, Episode: "Of Moose and Men" and "Operation Friendship") – Col. Spiker / Capt. Norman Traeger, M.D.
Columbo (1976, TV Series, Episode: "Old Fashioned Murder") – Edward Lytton
Wonder Woman (1977-1979, TV Series, Episode: "Judgment from Outer Space" and "The Starships are Coming") – Andros / Colonel Robert Elliot
Wheels (1978, TV miniseries) – Hub Hewitson
Buck Rogers in the 25th Century (1979-1981, TV Series, second male lead) – Dr. Elias Huer
Vegas (1981, TV Series, Episode: "Nightmare Come True") – Michael Pierce
The Dukes of Hazzard (1982, TV Series) – Mr. Thackery
Matt Houston (1983, TV Series, Episode: "Fear for Tomorrow") – Dr. Elias Baker 
Knight Rider (1983, TV series, Episode: "Brother's Keeper") – Phillip Hunt
The A-Team (1984, TV series, Episode: "Semi-Friendly Persuasion") – Karl Peerson
La Cruz de Iberia (1990) – Block (1986)-Tv.series season 5 episide 6  T.J Hooker-Tim O'Connor (blood sport) playing as a sentor in the role.part 1 and 2 (season5) (episode6)
The Naked Gun 2½: The Smell of Fear (1991) – Donald Fenswick
Star Trek: The Next Generation (1992, TV Series, Episode: "The Perfect Mate") – Ambassador Briam
Walker Texas Ranger (1995, TV Series) – Russell Stanley
Dreams Awake (2011) – Ambrose (final film role)

References

External links

1927 births
2018 deaths
Male actors from Chicago
American male film actors
American male television actors
People from Bloomingdale, New Jersey
20th-century American male actors
21st-century American male actors
Deaths from colorectal cancer
Deaths from cancer in California